Vaade Veedu is a 1973 Indian Telugu-language comedy drama film, produced by N. Ramabrahmam under the Sri Gowthami Pictures banner and directed by D. Yoganand. It stars N. T. Rama Rao and Manjula, with music composed by Satyam.

Plot
Zamindar Jaganatha Rao leads a happy family life with his wife Shantamma and two children. On the occasion of their son Rambabu's 5th birthday, a thief kidnaps him for his jewelry and conveys his wife Lakshmi that he has brought an orphan as they don't have children. After that, they leave the city and Jaganatha Rao dies due to depression. Years roll by, Rambabu grows up as Kondadu. Now Jaganatha Rao's manager Kodandam ploy along with Siddhanti (Allu Ramalingaiah) to grab the property and convinces Shantamma to adopt a boy. But she has a strong belief that her son will definitely return, so, Kodandam makes a plan to bring someone in his place. Meanwhile, Kondadu is about to reach the city in search of a job. On the way, he gets acquaintance with Savitri (Manjula) daughter of Kodandam and they fall in love. After reaching, Kodandam traps Kondadu and asks him to act like Rambabu and succeeds in it. After some time, Kondadu develops affection & emotional bondage with the family and treats Shantamma & her daughter Seeta (Leela Rani) as his own. At that point in time, learns that Seeta's marital life has been spoiled and his brother-in-law Shankar (Krishnam Raju) wants to get a divorce by suspecting her character. At present, Kondadu decides to set right his sister's life, so, in disguise along with his Seeta attracts Shankar when he finds out that all these are Kodandam's misdeeds. There onwards, Kondadu starts teaching a lesson to Kodandam with the help of Savitri. At last, he brings out the truth which makes Shankar realize his mistake. Meanwhile, Kondadu's foster mother Lakshmi also arrives and reveals Kodadu is only Rambabu. Finally, the movie ends on a happy note with the marriage of Kondadu & Savitri.

Cast
N.T.Rama Rao as  Rambabu / Kondadu
Manjula as  Savitri 
Krishnam Raju as Shankar 
Nagabhushanam as Kodandam 
Padmanabham as Bheemudu
Allu Ramalingaiah as Sidhanthi
Mikkilineni as Zamindar Jaganatha Rao
Ramana Reddy
Chalapathi Rao as C.B.I.Officer
KK Sarma
Pandari Bai as Shantamma
Hemalatha as Lakshmi
Sandhya Rani as  Sundari 
Leela Rani as Seeta

Soundtrack

Music composed by Satyam.

References

1973 comedy-drama films
1973 films
Indian comedy-drama films
Films scored by Satyam (composer)